Boratyn may refer to:

Boratyn (Subcarpathian Voivodeship), a village in Poland
Boratyn (Lviv Oblast), a village in Lviv oblast, Ukraine
, a village in Rivne oblast, Ukraine
, a village in Volyn oblast, Ukraine